La Cream is a Swedish Eurodance band.

Released only one album, Sound & Vision (1998), which had several hit singles.

La Cream consists of singer/dancer Tess. Was produced and mixed by Freddie Hogblad & Ari Lehtonen. Lyrics were mixture of French, Spanish and English. La Cream was Signed by label manager Menne Kosta at dr.records.

The band split up as Tess Mattisson pursued a solo career. 

On 2012 Tess returned as La Cream and has been touring in the popular 90s Festivals and shows around Europe, hugely popular in the Nordic countries.

https://www.facebook.com/LaCreamMusic

Discography

Sound & Vision (1998)
Intro (0:38)
Château d'Amour (3:17)
You (3:06)
Free (3:10) (Cover of Dr. Alban's 1996 hit This Time I'm Free)
Incendio (3:26)
Say Goodbye (3:23)
Bells Of Life (3:59)
Playing With Fire (3:39)
In Your Eyes (4:13)
Hold You (4:05)
Dance (3:22)
A.K.A Megamix Edit (5:48)

Singles
Château d'Amour (1997)
You (December 1998)
Say Goodbye (Jun, 11 1999)
Free (1999)

Production: Dr Records, Signed by Label Manager: Menne Kosta (Executive Producer Dr. Alban)
Château d'Amour (1997) *You (1998) *Say Goodbye (1999) *Free (1999) *Sound & Vision (1999) was produced in Faceless Production Studio / Dr Records

References

Swedish musical groups
Swedish Eurodance groups